
Year 525 (DXXV) was a common year starting on Wednesday (link will display the full calendar) of the Julian calendar. At the time, it was known as the Year of the Consulship of Probus and Philoxenus (or, less frequently, year 1278 Ab urbe condita). The denomination 525 for this year has been used since the early medieval period, when the Anno Domini calendar era became the prevalent method in Europe for naming years.  In this year, the monk Dionysius Exiguus proposed a calendar starting with the birth of Jesus (the AD system), so this was the first time the year was designated AD. However, the system was not used in general until the reign of Charlemagne in the 9th century.

Events 
 By place 

 Byzantine Empire 
 Emperor Justin I rebuilds the city of Anazarbus (modern Turkey) and renames it "Justinopolis".

 Britannia 
 Bernicia (North East England) is settled by the Angles (approximate date).

 Europe 
 King Theodoric the Great sends Pope John I to Constantinople, to negotiate a withdrawal of Byzantine emperor Justin's edict against Arian Christianity.
 Frankish tribesmen, under the command of King Chlothar I, plunder Burgundy.

 Africa 
 Kaleb, king of Aksum, collects a fleet and crosses from Africa to conquer Yemen. He establishes better trade ports on the Red Sea.

 Asia 
 The Daisan river, tributary of the Euphrates, floods Edessa, and within a couple of hours fills the entire city except for the highest parts. Eventually the pent-up waters break through the city walls. The Shroud of Turin is allegedly discovered during the rebuilding of the city (see Image of Edessa).

 By topic 

 Exploration and colonization 
 Cosmas Indicopleustes, Alexandrian explorer-geographer, travels up the Nile. He will venture as far to the east as Ceylon, become a monk, and write "Topographia Christiana" to vindicate the biblical account of the world (see 550).

 Religion 
 Dionysius Exiguus, Scythian theologian-mathematician, inaugurates the practice of using A.D. (Anno Domini) in Rome for calendar dates after the birth of Jesus Christ, a system which has been supported by subsequent studies. Dionysius also produces his tables for computing the date of "Cyclus Paschalis" (Easter Tables).
 The Arian baptistery of Santa Maria is built in Ripa (Rome).
 Buddhist caves are completed at Ajanta (India) with stone carvings (approximate date).

Births 
 Alexander of Tralles, physician (approximate date)
 Pope Benedict I, Pope of Catholic church (d. 579)
 John Climacus, monk and writer (approximate date)
 Justin, Byzantine aristocrat and general (d. 566)
 Liuvigild, king of the Visigoths (d. 586)
 Wideok, king of Baekje (Three Kingdoms of Korea)
 Yujiulü, empress of Western Wei (d. 540)

Deaths 
 Boethius, Roman philosopher and writer (or 524) 
 Bandzhis Firenz, king of Danmark and Medieval Gritzania
 Yuan Cha, high official of Northern Wei (approximate date)
 Yūsuf Dhū Nuwas, king of the Himyarite Kingdom (Yemen).

References